William Henry Mayfield (born October 17, 1957) is an American former professional basketball player. Mayfield signed as an undrafted free agent with the NBA's Golden State Warriors and played in seven games during the 1980–81 season. He also played for Unione Ginnastica Goriziana in Italy between 1981 and 1985.

References

1957 births
Living people
American expatriate basketball people in Italy
American men's basketball players
Basketball players from Detroit
Golden State Warriors players
Iowa Hawkeyes men's basketball players
Small forwards
Undrafted National Basketball Association players